Garza  may refer to:
 Garza (surname), including a list of people with the surname Garza
 Garza, Santiago del Estero, Argentina
 Garza County, Texas
 Garza language
 Dante Garza, a Killzone 2 character
 Azar v. Garza, a United States Supreme Court case also known as Garza v. Hargan.
 Garza v. Idaho, a United States Supreme Court case

See also
 Garz (disambiguation)
 Gaza (disambiguation)